Coded Arms: Contagion is a first-person shooter video game developed by Russian studio Creat Studios. It is the sequel to Coded Arms.

Gameplay
The gameplay is similar to the first game, Coded Arms. However, this time player has only 13 levels (and a training) with no random geometry, plus challenges which are available upon completion of a level. Full Motion Videos, storyline and much bigger landscapes are present. The player has to collect special point to upgrade his armor, health, and weapons. A new feature is included: the ability to hack computer panels, doors and turrets. The game's levels are divided into three portions: Industrial Zone, Military Zone, and A.I.D.A. Core. The only step back (compared to the previous title) is the absence of ragdoll physics.

Story

Special forces major Grant is part of an elite unit brought in to test and analyze the effectiveness of the reconfigured A.I.D.A. combat simulation program. After spreading aggressively through Earth's networks, and absorbing all the information it encountered, it turned into a program that required users to completely digitize their personalities to jack in, risking their lives for access to the rich cache of data. After a massive undertaking, A.I.D.A. has finally been contained.

Its code rewritten, the program is once again restricted for use in military training exercises. Active testing is in progress as the final touches are being applied to bring the system back online. At first, everything about the operation is routine, but it soon appears that the program is not stable. Grant, trapped in A.I.D.A. and guided by General Clark, has to locate the missing Bravo Team and defeat the new menace: a viral outbreak that corrupts every date encountered, caused by a group known only as "Maelstrom".

External links

Coded Arms Contagion from GameSpot
Coded Arms: Contagion at MobyGames

2007 video games
First-person shooters
PlayStation Portable games
Coded Arms
PlayStation Portable-only games
Science fiction video games
Multiplayer and single-player video games
Video games developed in Russia